Carl-Jan Colpaert is an American film director, producer, and screenwriter.

Early life
Carl-Jan Colpaert was born in Kortrijk, West Flanders, Belgium to father Roger Colpaert, who was a member of the executive committee at Bekaert and his mother, Marie-Therese Soens.  He is the second of four children, Ann Colpaert, Chris Colpaert and Tom Colpaert. Carl Colpaert attended the Catholic University of Leuven and the National Radio and Film institute in Brussels. He moved to Los Angeles in 1983 to attend The American Film Institute

Biography
Carl-Jan Colpaert was born in Belgium. He attended the American Film Institute, and started his professional career as a film editor for Roger Corman. He founded the production and distribution company Cineville in 1990 with Christoph Henkel.

Colpaert made his directorial debut in 1991 with Delusion, which he co-wrote with Kurt Voss. Three years later he helmed The Crew in an directorial effort that Variety called "misguided". Drowning on Dry Land, a 1999 film that he wrote and directed, drew praise for Barbara Hershey and criticism for a screenplay that made the film "destined for half-inch". His 2004 film The Affair was similarly panned, with Variety calling it a "homevid-bound indie drama that recalls the most pretentious pseudo-artsy product of the 1960s and '70s".

Two years later his film G.I. Jesus, about a Marine returning from the Iraq War, won the Grand Jury Prize at CineVegas. It was reviewed by Matt Zoller Seitz in The New York Times as "so impressive in so many ways that it demands to be taken seriously".

Colpaert has a star on the walk of fame in Ostend

Personal life

Colpaert resides in Malibu, California. He has two daughters, Jacqueline Dufwa-Colpaert (born in New York) and Celine Colpaert (born in Santa Monica), (Yves Dessca is godfather to Celine).

Selected filmography

Producer
Gas Food Lodging (1992) - Columbia Tristar
Mi Vida Loca (1993) - Sony Classics
Swimming with Sharks (1994) - Lionsgate
Cafe Society (film) (1995) - Showtime
The Whole Wide World (1996) - Sony Classics
Nevada (film) (1997) - Columbia Tristar
The Velocity of Gary (1997) - Columbia Tristar
Hurlyburly (film) (1997) - New Line Cinema
Where Eskimos Live (2000) - Cineville
Mrs. Palfrey at the Claremont"" (2006) - Cineville/ BBCDisconnected (2016) - Warner Bros.Female Fight Club (2017) - LionsgateAfterward (film) (2020) - LionsgatePaul Is Dead (film)(2021) - CinevilleYucatan (film) (2021) - Lionsgate

DirectorIn the Aftermath (1988) – New World InternationalDelusion (1991) – Columbia TristarThe Crew (1994) – LionsgateDrowning on Dry Land (1999) -UnipixFaçade (2000) – SonyThe Affair (2004) – CinevilleG.I. Jesús (2006) – CinevilleBlack Limousine (2012) – Anchor Bay FilmsSomething About Her (2020) – CinevilleDiamonds In the Sky'' (2021) - Cineville

References

External links
Cineville homepage

1963 births
American film directors
American film producers
American male screenwriters
Living people